Anbaric may refer to:

An archaic term for the word electrical used in the fantasy trilogy His Dark Materials by Philip Pullman
Anbaric Transmission, an electric power company